Gerardo Murillo Coronado, also known by his signature "Dr. Atl", (October 3, 1875 – August 15, 1964) was a Mexican painter and writer.  He was actively involved in the Mexican Revolution in the Constitutionalist faction led by Venustiano Carranza. He had ties to the anarchosyndicalist labor organization, the Casa del Obrero Mundial "House of the World Worker."

Biography
Born in Guadalajara, Jalisco, he began studying painting at an early age, under Felipe Castro. At 21, Murillo entered the Academy of San Carlos in Mexico City to further his studies.

After demonstrating his talent, Murillo was awarded a grant in 1897 by the government of Porfirio Díaz to study  painting in Europe. There he broadened his scope of learning, with study of philosophy and law at the University of Rome, and many trips to Paris to hear lectures on art given by Henri Bergson. His strong interest in politics led him to collaborate with the Socialist Party in Italy and work in the Avanti newspaper. In 1902 he was "baptized" "Dr. Atl" (the Nahuatl word for "water") by Leopoldo Lugones.

Dr. Atl became very active in Mexico when he returned. In 1906 he participated with Diego Rivera, Francisco de la Torre, Rafael Ponce de León and others in an exhibition sponsored by Alonso Cravioto and Luis Castillo Ledon, the editors of the magazine Savia Moderna.

In 1906, Dr. Atl issued a manifesto calling for the development of a monumental public art movement in Mexico linked to the lives and interests of the Mexican people, a precursor of the Mexican Mural Movement launched in 1922.  He was also commissioned by the Díaz government to design a glass curtain for the Institute of Fine Arts (Bellas Artes) under construction in Mexico City, which was executed by Tiffany's of New York. The curtain featured the two volcanoes overlooking the capital.  He was also commissioned to paint a mural, which was postponed by the eruption of the Mexican Revolution against Porfirio Díaz in 1910.

In 1911, Dr. Atl returned to Europe. In Paris, he founded a journal and wrote about the social and political issues of Mexico, and criticized General Victoriano Huerta, who had helped overthrow the democratically elected government of Francisco I. Madero. Dr. Atl supported the Constitutionalist faction in the Mexican Revolution, leaning towards "biblical socialism" and promoting the growth of art, literature, and science.  When he returned from Europe, he joined the Constitutionalist forces led by Venustiano Carranza,
and was appointed Director of the Academy of San Carlos.  During the Revolution, he persuaded two young art students, José Clemente Orozco and David Alfaro Siqueiros, to join the Carrancistas and illustrated La Vanguardia, the carrancista official paper.

The winning faction of the Revolution rejected the Euro-centric emphasis of the Mexican government in the 19th and early 20th century and following the Revolution, there was a revival of interest in Mexico's rich indigenous past and the popular arts, including folk dance, music, arts and crafts.  Dr. Atl and other artists arranged exhibits of the folk arts and performances of popular dance and music and Dr. Atl prepared a two-volume study, Folk Arts in Mexico, published by the Mexican government in 1922.

Dr. Atl's strong love of the outdoors and his active nature are seen in his many paintings which portray the landscapes of his era. Among his interests was the study of volcanoes, and he spent much time visiting both Popocatépetl and Iztaccíhuatl.  In his 1950 book, Cómo nace y crece un volcán, el Paricutín ("How a Volcano is Born and Grows – Paricutín"), he told of his experience of witnessing the eruption of Paricutín in 1943. He was injured while observing the eruption and his leg was amputated.  Besides painting volcanic landscapes, he was considered an expert volcanologist and his papers were valuable to understanding volcanos.

His literary writings include Cuentos de todos los colores ("Stories of All Colors"), which focuses on the themes of the Mexican Revolution and has been hailed as one of the best narrations of that historical period. His book La Perla ("The Pearl") inspired the writing of the novella, much the same, by John Steinbeck.
He gave the Nahuatl name "Nahui Olin" (a symbol of Aztec renewal meaning "four movement," the symbol of earthquakes) to Carmen Mondragón (1893–1978), a Mexican poet and painter with whom he established a very intense love relationship.

Dr. Atl received numerous awards for his literature and art, including the Belisario Domínguez Medal of Honor, in 1956, and the National Arts Award in 1958.

In 1961, Alcoa Presents: One Step Beyond aired an episode based on an experience of Dr. Atl in 1920. The plot description states: "On the run from the authorities, Atl (played by David J. Stewart) takes refuge in a convent that is allegedly haunted by the ghost of an Aztec warrior. Of course, Atl is too intelligent a man to believe in such nonsense—until the Federale who is pursuing him is mysteriously strangled to death. The real Dr. Atl makes a guest appearance in the closing scene."

Dr. Atl died in Mexico City in 1964 and is buried in Panteon Civil de Dolores cemetery in the capital.

Tribute
Four chapters of Rebecca West's book Survivors in Mexico deal with the life of Dr. Atl.

On October 3, 2017, Google celebrated his 142nd birthday with a Google Doodle.

References

Further reading
Archivo General de la Nación, Mexico. "El Dr. Atl y la Confederación Mundial del Trabajo." Boletín del Archivo General de la Nación 3.15 (1981): 17-18.
Bordan, Iain and Jane Rendell, eds. (2000).  Intersections: Architectural Histories and Critical Theories. London: Routledge.
Calderazzo, John (2004). "Rising fire : volcanoes and our inner lives". Guilford, CT: Lyons Press. p61 ff
Casado Navarro, Arturo. El Dr. Atl (1984).
Cumberland, Charles (1957). "Dr. Atl and Venustiano Carranza." The Americas. 13.
Espejo, Beatriz (1994). "Gerardo Murillo: El paisaje como pasión". Coyoacán, Mexico: Fondo Editorial de la Plástica Mexica.
(1964). "Gerardo Murillo, Mexican Artist, 89." The New York Times. August 16.
Galerie Joubert et Richebour, Exposition Dr. Atl: les montagnes du Mexique. Paris: Galerie Joubert et Richebourg 1914.
Helm, Mckinley (1989). Modern Mexican Painters. New York: Harper Brothers.
Lear, John. Picturing the Proletariat: Artists and Labor in Revolutionary Mexico, 1908-1940. Austin: University of Texas Press 2017.
Murrillo, Gerardo. Dr. Atl: Pinturas y dibujos. 1974. 
Patterson, Robert (1964). "An Art in Revolution: Antecedents of Mexican Mural Painting, 1900-1920." Journal of Inter-American Studies. 6.
Pilcher, Jeffrey (2003). The Human Tradition in Mexico. Wilmington: Scholarly Resources.
White, D. Anthony, Siqueiros: Biography of a Revolutionary Artist'' (Book Surge, 2009)

External links 

1875 births
1964 deaths
20th-century Mexican male artists
20th-century Mexican painters
Artists from Guadalajara, Jalisco
Artists from Mexico City
Members of El Colegio Nacional (Mexico)
Mexican amputees
Mexican landscape painters
Mexican male painters
Mexican muralists
People of the Mexican Revolution
Recipients of the Belisario Domínguez Medal of Honor
Volcanologists
Wikipedia articles containing unlinked shortened footnotes